Legally Blonde is a 2001 American romantic comedy film directed by Robert Luketic in his feature-length directorial debut, and scripted by Karen McCullah Lutz and Kirsten Smith from Amanda Brown's 2001 novel of the same name. It stars Reese Witherspoon, Luke Wilson, Selma Blair, Matthew Davis, Victor Garber, and Jennifer Coolidge. The story follows Elle Woods (Witherspoon), a sorority girl who attempts to win back her ex-boyfriend Warner Huntington III (Davis) by getting a Juris Doctor degree at Harvard Law School, and in the process, overcomes stereotypes against blondes and triumphs as a successful lawyer.

The outline of Legally Blonde originated from Brown's experiences as a blonde going to Stanford Law School while being obsessed with fashion and beauty, reading Elle  magazine, and frequently clashing with the personalities of her peers. In 2000, Brown met producer Marc Platt, who helped her develop her manuscript into a novel. Platt brought in screenwriters McCullah Lutz and Smith to adapt the book into a motion picture. The project caught the attention of director Luketic, an Australian newcomer who came to Hollywood on the success of his quirky debut short film Titsiana Booberini. "I had been reading scripts for two years, not finding anything I could put my own personal mark on, until Legally Blonde came around," Luketic said.

The film was released on July 13, 2001, and was a hit with audiences, grossing $141 million worldwide on an $18 million budget, as well as receiving moderately positive reviews from critics, with particular praise going to Witherspoon's performance. It was nominated for a Golden Globe Award for Best Motion Picture: Musical or Comedy. Witherspoon received a Golden Globe nomination for Best Actress – Motion Picture Musical or Comedy, and the 2002 MTV Movie Award for Best Female Performance. The film has gained a Cult following.

The box office success led to a series of films: a 2003 sequel, Legally Blonde 2: Red, White & Blonde, and a 2009 direct-to-DVD spin-off, Legally Blondes. Additionally, Legally Blonde: The Musical premiered on January 23, 2007, in San Francisco and opened in New York City at the Palace Theatre on Broadway on April 29, 2007, starring Laura Bell Bundy.

In May 2020, it was announced that Mindy Kaling and Dan Goor were signed to write a third film. The third film was set to release in 2022 but has been delayed to an undisclosed date.

Plot

Fashion merchandising student and sorority girl Elle Woods is taken to an expensive restaurant by her boyfriend, Warner Huntington III. She expects a proposal, but he breaks up with her instead. Intending to go to Harvard Law School and become a successful politician, he believes that Elle is not "serious" enough for that kind of life. Elle believes she can win Warner back if she shows herself capable of achieving the same things. After months of studying, Elle scores a 179 on the Law School Admission Test and, combined with her 4.0 GPA, is accepted to Harvard Law School.

Upon arriving at Harvard, Elle's SoCal personality is a complete contrast to her East Coast classmates, who frequently distrust her. She soon encounters Warner but discovers he is engaged to his old girlfriend, Vivian Kensington, who considers Elle a fool. Later, Elle tells Warner that she intends to apply for one of her professor's internships, but he tells her that she is wasting her time as she is not intelligent enough. Realizing that Warner will never take her back or take her seriously, Elle finds motivation to prove herself by working hard and demonstrating her understanding of the subject.

The following semester, Professor Callahan, the school's most respected teacher, decides to take on some first-year interns to help with a high-profile case. Among those chosen are Elle, Warner, and Vivian. Callahan is defending a prominent fitness instructor named Brooke Windham, one of Elle's role models. Accused of murdering her husband, Brooke is unwilling to produce her alibi, and she later reveals to Elle that she was having liposuction, a fact that would ruin her reputation, which Elle promises not to disclose. Vivian gains a new respect for Elle and reveals that Warner could not get into Harvard without his father's help. Emmett Richmond, Callahan's junior partner, has also taken notice of her potential.

One night, Callahan tries seducing Elle, who now believes that is why she got the internship. Devastated, she quits and nearly returns home to California, telling Emmett what happened. When he tells Brooke, she fires Callahan, replacing him with Elle under Emmett's guidance; as she is only a law student, Emmett cites a Massachusetts Supreme Court ruling that law students may represent clients if they do so under the supervision of a licensed attorney (though in actuality this ruling only applies to third-year law students).

Elle begins to cross-examine Brooke's stepdaughter, Chutney, and catches her in a lie when she discovers significant inconsistencies in her story: Chutney testified that she was home during her father's murder but did not hear the gunshot because she was in the shower after getting her hair permed that morning. Elle says that washing permed hair within the first 24 hours would deactivate the ammonium thioglycolate, pointing out that Chutney's curls are still intact. A distraught Chutney admits her culpability in inadvertently killing her father as she really intended to kill Brooke because she hated the fact that her father married someone the same age as her.

After the trial, Chutney is sent to jail, and Warner approaches Elle and asks her to take him back as she has proven herself. She rejects him, realizing that he is shallow and a "complete bonehead". However, she and Vivian become good friends, especially after Vivian dumps Warner. Elle gives the graduation speech two years later, while Warner graduates with no honors, no job offers, and no girlfriend. Emmett has started his own law firm and has been dating Elle for two years, with plans to propose to her later that night.

Cast

Production

Background

Amanda Brown published Legally Blonde in 2001, basing it upon her real life experiences as a blonde attending Stanford Law School, while being obsessed with fashion and beauty, reading Elle magazine, and frequently clashing with the personalities of her peers.

Brown said that when she first arrived at Stanford, she discovered she had made a big mistake. "I was in my first week of law school, in 1993, and I saw this flyer for "The Women of Stanford Law," so I was like, 'I'll go and meet some nice girls. Whatever.' I went to the meeting, and these were not women. These were really angry people. The woman who was leading it spent three years at Stanford trying to change the name 'semester' to 'ovester.' I started laughing and I realized everyone in the room took it very seriously. So I didn't make any friends there."

Brown wrote letters to her parents about these experiences and originally thought about writing a book of essays about her law school experience until a literary agent advised her to adapt them into a novel. Brown took a community college writing class, put together a manuscript, and shopped the book around but was unsuccessful. She later resubmitted her manuscript again, this time in pink, which got the attention of an agent, and "movie people went nuts." Amanda's mother, Suzanne, remembers the day of the bidding war and thought she would be lucky to get $10,000 but the final figure was considerably more.

Producer Marc Platt was intrigued by the character of Elle Woods when an unpublished novel manuscript was delivered to him. "What I loved about this story is that it's hilarious, it's sexy and, at the same time, it's empowering," says Platt. "The world looks at Elle and sees someone who is blonde and beautiful but nothing more. Elle, on the other hand, doesn't judge herself or anybody else. She thinks the world's great, she's great, everyone's great and nothing can change that. She's truly an irrepressible modern heroine."

Screenwriters Karen McCullah Lutz and Kirsten Smith spent two days on Stanford's campus in the spring of 2000 doing research for their screenplay based on Brown's novel. Director Robert Luketic, an Australian newcomer who came to Hollywood on the success of his quirky debut short film Titsiana Booberini, was drawn to the project while looking for a breakthrough film. "I had been reading scripts for two years, not finding anything I could put my own personal mark on, until Legally Blonde came around," Luketic said.

Development

Luketic explained that when the studio first green-lit the project, they were not aware that the film would be structured as a progressively feel-good, women's empowerment movie. "Initially, they thought it was going to be much more wet T-shirts and boobs than it actually turned out to be", said Luketic. In fact, the first script for Legally Blonde was edgy and raunchy in a similar vein to American Pie. The murder trial was not part of the plot and the film ended with Elle getting into a relationship with a professor. "It transformed from nonstop zingers that were very adult in nature to this universal story of overcoming adversity by being oneself," said Smith. When it was decided to change the film's plot, McCullah and Smith finessed some details and added a few characters, like Paulette.

Charlize Theron, Gwyneth Paltrow, Alicia Silverstone, Katherine Heigl, Christina Applegate, Milla Jovovich and Jennifer Love Hewitt were all considered for the lead role but Luketic said he "knew on page five of the script that [he] wanted Reese to play Elle." "I wanted someone with gravitas and brains," he explained. "There had to be more behind the face, and Reese just fit the bill." Witherspoon was the first person who read the script, and it was not sent to any other actresses; casting director Joseph Middleton had also previously worked with Witherspoon in The Man in the Moon and A Far Off Place, so he strongly believed in her for the role when Platt brought up Witherspoon's name. Applegate turned down the role and Platt suggested at one point to cast Britney Spears, but McCullah convinced him to not cast Spears after her Saturday Night Live appearance. Despite Luketic's enthusiasm for Witherspoon to be cast as the lead, Metro-Goldwyn-Mayer was not convinced. Witherspoon's performance as Tracy Flick in Election put her at risk of being typecast by the studio heads. "They thought I was a shrew," Witherspoon told The Hollywood Reporter. Witherspoon had been passed over for several other post-Election roles. "My manager finally called and said, 'You've got to go meet with the studio head because he will not approve you. He thinks you really are your character from Election and that you're repellent.' And then I was told to dress sexy." Witherspoon went through several rounds of auditions for the part, even meeting with executives in character with a Southern California accent. "I remember a room full of men who were asking me questions about being a coed and being in a sorority," Witherspoon recalled. "Even though I had dropped out of college four years earlier and I have never been inside a sorority house." Luketic remembered meeting with her to discuss how she'd approach the role. "We met at a hotel on Sunset Boulevard and discussed the film...we were both concerned about some aspects, like how can the audience feel sorry for a rich girl driving a Porsche; and she had to dress in a very particular way that wasn't distracting or off-putting...And every decision came from a certain innocence [of the character]."

Jennifer Coolidge was cast as Elle's manicurist friend Paulette, a role which according to some rumors Coolidge heard, Courtney Love and Kathy Najimy were up for. For the role of Warner's new girlfriend Vivian, Smith suggested to cast Chloë Sevigny in the role, but such suggestion did not work out, so Selma Blair was cast instead; Blair and Witherspoon had previously been together in Cruel Intentions, allowing their friendship to be an anchor between their characters. Ali Larter was originally wanted to play one of Elle's sorority sisters, but upon reading the script, she fell in love with the character of Brooke Taylor Windham, the fitness instructor on trial for murder.

The screenwriters envisioned Luke Wilson as they were coming up with Elle's love interest Emmett Richmond. "They auditioned a bunch of other guys and we're like, 'How about auditioning Luke Wilson for the Luke Wilson role?'" McCullah Lutz said. Middleton desired to cast Paul Bettany as Emmett, but the crew felt that the character should be American whereas Bettany is British.

The final product came after "something like 10 drafts of the script. I worked with the writers (Kirsten Smith, Karen McCullah Lutz, working from Amanda Brown's novel) who stayed on after we started shooting," Luketic explained. "And we'd have re-thinks and re-writes, often in the middle of the night." An unused idea for the finished film included having a cameo appearance of Judge Judy during Elle's Harvard video essay in which Elle and her friends chased down the show's host, but the scene was cut when Judge Judy Sheindlin could not get on board. Alanna Ubach suggested instead to cast Witherspoon's then husband Ryan Phillippe for the part, rewritten as a male character, but Witherspoon did not feel the idea would play out.

Witherspoon researched the character by studying sorority girls on their campuses and associated hot spots. She went to dinner with them and joked she was conducting an "anthropological study". "I could have gone into this and been really ditsy and played what I would have thought this character was, and I would have missed a whole other side of her," Witherspoon added. "But by going down to Beverly Hills, hanging out in Neiman Marcus, eating in their cafe and seeing how these women walk and speak, I got into the reality of the character. I saw how polite these women are, and I saw how much they value their female friendships and how important it is to support each other".

The cast and crew also did a lot of research, with McCullah and Smith visiting the Stanford Law School for a week during orientation time; a scene of a group composed of new students going around in a circle was inspired on law students the screenwriters eavesdropped during their visit. They also sat for the criminal law and constitutional law classes; McCullah particularly got bored during the second class despite finding the first interesting, but this inspired her to write some scenes during that class.

Reese Witherspoon said in an interview regarding her character:

Costume design

The film's costume designer, Sophie De Rakoff, became fast friends with Witherspoon on the set, bonding over Dolly Parton. "It was that simple. We just liked each other, and geeked out on Dolly," De Rakoff said. The dominant color palette for Elle's outfits in the film is pink. "The backstory is, Reese and I, and maybe the production designers, went to visit some sororities [in downtown Los Angeles]. We knew that she needed a signature color, and we were like, 'Do we really want it to be pink? It's so on the nose. It's so feminine. Could we do lavender? Could we do light blue? Is there another color that we could do?' When we met all the sorority girls, it had to be pink."

Witherspoon sported 40 different hairstyles in the film. "Oh my God, it became known as 'The Hair That Ate Hollywood,'" Luketic said. "It became all about the hair. I have this obsession with flyaways. It would annoy Reese a little bit because I would always have hairdressers in her face. But really the most time and research and testing on the set went into getting the color right, because 'blonde' is subject to interpretation, I found."

Filming

Luketic said he was "terrified" on his first day of filming. "I come from making a ten-minute short with a crew of ten people to a crew of 200 and having enough trucks and trailers to wrap around a city block."

Both the University of Southern California and Stanford refused to allow the producers to use their college names in the film. "[The producers of the film] asked if they could set the film at USC, but the images of her as an undergraduate and being in a sorority ... we felt there was too much stereotyping going on," says Elijah May, campus filming coordinator at USC. The production settled on having Elle go to a fictional college called CULA.

Although the film was primarily set at Harvard University, campus scenes were filmed at USC, University of California, Los Angeles, California Institute of Technology, and Rose City High School in Pasadena, California. Production initially lasted from October to December 2000.

The "bend and snap" scene — where Elle explains to Paulette how to get her crush's attention — almost did not make it into the movie.
"[Producer] Marc Platt wanted a B plot for Paulette (Jennifer Coolidge)," McCullah Lutz told Entertainment Weekly. "At first we were like, 'Should the store be robbed?'" Co-writer Kirsten Smith observed, "I think we spent a week or two trying to figure out what the B plot and this big set piece should be. There were crime plots. We were pitching scene after scene and it all felt very tonally weird".

Later, while brainstorming at a bar in Los Angeles, McCullah Lutz came up with a solution: "What if Elle shows [Paulette] a move so she can get the UPS guy?" On the spur of the moment, Smith invented a move, standing up and demonstrating what would become the bend and snap. Smith explains, "It was a spontaneous invention. It was a completely drunken moment in a bar." Director Robert Luketic later adapted the "bend and snap" move into a dance number for the film.

"... It was a fully choreographed number by Toni Basil, and she was awesome," Witherspoon recalls. "She did the whole dance." "I remember just reading it and thinking it was the most hysterical thing ever," she added. "That is still the most asked request I get from people. Even this past year, when I have been giving speeches or talking about whatever, they always ask me, 'Will you do the bend and snap?' I have a feeling I will be doing the bend and snap until I am 95". While filming the courthouse scenes, Raquel Welch requested cinematographer Anthony B. Richmond special lightning for her scenes as Mrs. Windham Vandermark due to her obsession with light and dressed on her own accord to look better.

The film originally ended at the courthouse right after Woods won the case, with Elle on the courthouse steps sharing a victory kiss with Emmett, then cutting one year into the future to her and a now-blonde Vivian starting their own Blonde Legal Defense Club at law school. After test audiences revealed they did not like this ending, McCullah Lutz and Smith consulted with Luketic, Platt and other members of the production team while still in the lobby of the movie theater and they all agreed a new conclusion was necessary. "It was just kind of a weak ending," explained screenwriter McCullah Lutz. "The kiss didn't feel right because it's not a rom-com — it wasn't about their relationship. So test audiences were saying, 'We want to see what happens — we want to see her succeed.' So that's why we rewrote for graduation". Ubach and Jessica Cauffiel claim that the original ending also included Elle and Vivian drinking margaritas in Hawaii, with the implication that they were either now best friends or involved romantically although Smith and McCullah never wrote such ending. Other endings proposed for the film included a musical number in which Elle, the judge, the jury and everyone in the courthouse broke into singing and dancing.

The screenwriters wrote a new ending taking place at graduation, which was filmed at Dulwich College in London, England since Witherspoon was in that city filming The Importance of Being Earnest. Witherspoon had also cut her hair for that film and Wilson had shaved his head for The Royal Tenenbaums. As both actors had changed their hair for their next movies, each had to wear wigs for the scene.

Reception

Box office
Legally Blonde was released on July 13, 2001 in North America. Its opening weekend gross of $20 million made it a sleeper hit for the struggling MGM studio, and it went on to gross $96.5 million in North America and $45.2 million elsewhere, for a worldwide total of $141.7 million. The film was released in the United Kingdom on October 26, 2001, and opened on #2, behind American Pie 2.

Critical response
On Rotten Tomatoes Legally Blonde has an approval rating of 70% based on reviews from 147 critics, with an average rating of 6.20/10. The site's consensus reads, "Though the material is predictable and formulaic, Reese Witherspoon's funny, nuanced performance makes this movie better than it would have been otherwise." On Metacritic the film has a score of 59 out of 100, based on 32 reviews, indicating "mixed or average reviews". Audiences surveyed by CinemaScore gave the film a grade "A−" on scale of A to F.

Roger Ebert gave it three out of four stars, saying the film was "impossible to dislike" and "Witherspoon effortlessly animated this material with sunshine and quick wit." Todd McCarthy of Variety said Witherspoon gave a "wonderful and winning" performance. "Beaming star wattage out of every pore, not to mention her hair, Witherspoon once again proves herself a comedienne worthy of comparison to such golden era greats as Carole Lombard and Ginger Rogers." Michael Wilmington of Chicago Tribune also commended Witherspoon's performance, saying her "comic timing immaculate, her persona irresistible. But it's her spirit and immersion in the part that really infuse the whole film and make it work." He added that Witherspoon [pours] "so much humor and pizazz into Elle that she lifts up the whole movie." B. Ruby Rich of The Nation called it "the best empowerment movie for teenage girls to come along in ages." CNN's Paul Clinton lauded the film as a "sassy satire that retains a message: believe in yourself and follow your dreams."

Others were more critical of the film and its screenplay. Kirk Honeycutt of The Hollywood Reporter described the film as "predictable, cutesy and surprisingly short on genuine humor" but "still gets by thanks to the magnetic presence of Witherspoon." Michael O'Sullivan of The Washington Post called the movie a "Clueless redux but without the edgy, knowing wit." Jessica Winter of The Village Voice panned the film as a "junk-food movie striving to be nutritious." "It's one of your racier Be Yourself after-school specials crossed with Who Moved My Cheese? for Cosmo girls," Winter asserted.

Legal accuracy
Legally Blonde has received mixed reviews among legal scholars for its depiction of law school and the accuracy of its application of the law.

Devin Stone, better known online as LegalEagle, a YouTuber and American lawyer, observed that the application process portrayed in the movie in which Elle Woods sent the Harvard Law School admissions board a video essay was not possible. "There's no way to upload that on the law school application system," Stone noted. "During orientation, Harvard Law School actually played the clip of Elle's admissions video with the admissions committee deciding to let her in, and then they swore that's not how they made decisions," explained Jameyanne Fuller, a student at Harvard Law School.

Certain elements of law school are also omitted from the film. "The movie totally skipped first semester exams which is like the most stressful time in law school ever," said Fuller.

Stone said Woods had no authority to act as a lawyer when she represented Paulette Bonafonté over custody of her dog from her ex-husband and called her conduct a "huge ethical violation." "She hasn't finished law school, she's never passed the bar and she has absolutely no right to call herself an attorney," Stone observed. "That's called the unauthorized practice of law. If anyone finds out that she committed this...while she was at Harvard Law School, she'd probably be barred from entering the bar in virtually any state in the United States." Unauthorized practice of law in Massachusetts carries a fine of $100 or imprisonment for not more than six months.

Contrary to what is shown in the film, Woods would not be able to question a witness on the stand during a criminal trial, W. Bradley Wendel, a law professor at  Cornell Law School, explained in his book, Professional Responsibility: Examples & Explanations.

"In the real world, the judge in Legally Blonde would not have permitted the defendant to fire the Alan Dershowitz-like lawyer in the middle of trial and retain the law student, never mind that no state permits first-year law students to represent clients in court," Wendel wrote. The film cites Massachusetts Supreme Judicial Court Rule 3.03 as precedent for Woods being able to represent a client while under the supervision of a licensed attorney, but the ruling only applies to third-year law students.

"A first-year law student would never be able to question witnesses in a criminal court. The most she would be doing as a 1L (first-year student) would be research and drafting memos or motions, maybe," said Emma Therrien, a student at Lewis & Clark Law School.

Accolades

Legacy
More than 20 years later, the film continues to inspire generations of filmgoers, many of them women who went on to become prospective law students. "At least once a week, I have a woman come up to me and say, 'I went to law school because of Legally Blonde,'" Witherspoon said. "It's incredible...You can be unapologetically feminine but also smart and driven."

"When I saw the movie I just felt it gave me like a real surge of motivation because I really identified with her," Layla Summers, a family law attorney, told Spectrum News. "I think the movie is still very relevant," she added. "Just being a girl and being a woman, the odds are stacked against you still...When I watch the movie now I feel like I'm part of a great club of powerful professional women, like a sorority."

"When I got to law school, on the toughest days, I would pop in the movie and get a good laugh," Shalyn Smith, a California law student and sorority president, said in an interview with People magazine. "Elle embodies fighting for what is right, staying true to yourself, and defeating the odds. It's crazy that one movie can do that, you know?"

Entertainment reporter Lucy Ford revealed to Witherspoon during an interview in 2018 that she had written her college dissertation on the film and presented her a pink-ribbon bound copy.

Soundtrack

The Legally Blonde soundtrack includes music from Vanessa Carlton, Samantha Mumba, Superchick, and Hoku, who sings the opening song, "Perfect Day."

"No one really knew that Legally Blonde was going to be what it was, Literally, [my label heads] were like, 'This movie's not going to become anything.' And then the next thing you know, it's like, this iconic movie. And my song opens it!" Hoku said in an interview with Billboard. "Sitting in the premiere and hearing my song open the movie, and everyone's cheering – it felt like, 'I've really arrived now, folks.'"

The soundtrack album was released July 10, 2001, by A&M Records.

Franchise

The success of the film spawned a sequel, Legally Blonde 2: Red, White & Blonde, a musical, one straight-to-home video release starring British twins Camilla and Rebecca Rosso, Legally Blondes, and a third theatrical film in development, with Mindy Kaling and Dan Goor announced as writers.

Musical

In April 2007, a musical adaptation premiered on Broadway to mixed reviews, starring Laura Bell Bundy as Elle, Christian Borle as Emmett, Orfeh as Paulette, Nikki Snelson as Brooke, Richard H. Blake as Warner, Kate Shindle as Vivienne, and Michael Rupert as Callahan, running until October 19, 2008. The show, Bundy, Borle, and Orfeh were all nominated for Tony Awards. Later, the Broadway show was the focus of an MTV reality-TV series called Legally Blonde: The Musical – The Search for Elle Woods, in which the winner would take over the role of Elle on Broadway. Bailey Hanks from Anderson, South Carolina, won the competition.

Legally Blonde also had a three-year run at the Savoy Theatre in London's West End, starring Sheridan Smith, Susan McFadden, and Carley Stenson as Elle, and Duncan James, Richard Fleeshman, Simon Thomas, and Ben Freeman as Warner. During its run, the cast also included Alex Gaumond, Denise Van Outen, and Lee Mead.

References

External links

 
 
 
 'Legally Blonde' Oral History: From Raunchy Script to Feminist Classic.

2001 comedy films
2000s legal films
2001 films
American comedy films
American legal films
Blond hair
2000s feminist films
Films about lawyers
Films about fraternities and sororities
Films based on American novels
Films directed by Robert Luketic
Films produced by Marc E. Platt
Films set in 2001
Films set in 2004
Films set in Harvard University
Films set in Los Angeles
Films set in Massachusetts
Films set in universities and colleges
Films shot in Boston
Films shot in London
Films shot in Los Angeles
Metro-Goldwyn-Mayer films
American feminist comedy films
Legal comedy films
Films scored by Rolfe Kent
2001 directorial debut films
Vegetarianism in fiction
Films about beauty queens
Legally Blonde (franchise)
2000s English-language films
2000s American films
American romantic comedy films